Tregeseal (from , meaning "Catihael's settlement") is a hamlet in a valley below the town of St Just, Cornwall, UK and is within the parish of St Just. Nearby is Tregeseal East stone circle. Tregeseal lies within the Cornwall Area of Outstanding Natural Beauty (AONB); almost a third of Cornwall has AONB designation, with the same status and protection as a National Park.

References

Hamlets in Cornwall
Penwith
St Just in Penwith